The South East Men's League is a division within rugby league's tier 4 and was previously a division of the Rugby League Conference. At the division is  competed for by teams in the South East of England including London.

Many of the clubs run juniors in the London Junior League.

History

The Rugby League Conference was founded in 1997 as the Southern Conference, a 10-team pilot league for teams in the South of England and the English Midlands. A Southern Division first appeared in 1998 and would remain an ever-present with minor name changes except for the 2008 season.

The South Premier Division was first competed for in 2005.

Community game pyramid

National Conference League
Conference League South
South Premier
 London & South East Men's League
London, South and East Entrance League

The London & South East Men's League is below the South Premier and above the London, South and East Entrance League.

2014 structure
Guildford Giants
Medway Dragons
Portsmouth Navy Seahawks
Southampton Spitfires
Sussex Merlins
Weald Warriors

Participating teams by season
1998: Crawley Jets, North London Skolars, Oxford Cavaliers, St Albans Centurions, West London Sharks 1
1999: Crawley Jets, North London Skolars, Oxford Cavaliers, St Albans Centurions, West London Sharks 1
2000: Crawley Jets, Kingston Warriors, North London Skolars, Oxford Cavaliers, South London Storm, West London Sharks 1
2001: Crawley Jets, Kingston Warriors, North London Skolars, South London Storm, West London Sharks
2002: Crawley Jets, Kingston Warriors, North London Skolars, South London Storm, West London Sharks
2003: Crawley Jets, Gosport & Fareham Vikings, Greenwich Admirals, Hemel Stags 'A', Kingston Warriors, North London Skolars 'A', South London Storm 'A', West London Sharks
2004: Crawley Jets, Gosport & Fareham Vikings, Greenwich Admirals, Kingston Warriors, South London Storm 'A', West London Sharks 2
2005: Gosport & Fareham Vikings, Haringey Hornets, Hemel Stags 'A', Kingston Warriors, Middlesex Lions, South London Storm 'A'
2006: Broadstairs Bulldogs, Greenwich Admirals, Haringey Hornets 'A', Hemel Stags 'A', Kent Ravens, St Albans Centurions 'A' 3
2007: Broadstairs Bulldogs, Farnborough Falcons, Finchley, Gosport & Fareham Vikings 2
2009: Farnborough Falcons, Greenwich Admirals, Kent Ravens, Oxford Cavaliers, Southampton Spitfires, Swindon St George
2010: Elmbridge Eagles, Greenwich Admirals, Guildford Giants, Oxford Cavaliers, South London Storm A, Southampton Spitfires, Sussex Merlins, Swindon St George
2011: Elmbridge Eagles, Greenwich Admirals, Guildford Giants, Medway Dragons, Portsmouth Navy Seahawks, Southampton Spitfires, Sussex Merlins
2012: Greenwich Admirals, Guildford Giants, Medway Dragons, Portsmouth Navy Seahawks, Southampton Spitfires, Sussex Merlins
2013: Guildford Giants, Medway Dragons, Portsmouth Navy Seahawks, Southampton Spitfires, Sussex Merlins, Weald Warriors
2014: Guildford Giants, Medway Dragons, Portsmouth Navy Seahawks, Southampton Spitfires, Sussex Merlins, Weald Warriors

1 as Southern division
2 as South division
3 as South East division

Winners

1998: Crawley Jets 1
1999: Crawley Jets 1
2000: North London Skolars (now London Skolars) 1
2001: Crawley Jets 4
2002: North London Skolars (now London Skolars) 4
2003: Crawley Jets 4
2004: West London Sharks 2
2005: Kingston Warriors (now Elmbridge) 4
2006: Broadstairs Bulldogs 3
2007: Farnborough Falcons 2
2009: Greenwich Admirals 4
2010: Greenwich Admirals 4
2011: Elmbridge Eagles 4
2012: Portsmouth Navy Seahawks 
2013: Portsmouth Navy Seahawks

1 as Rugby League Conference Southern division
2 as Rugby League Conference South division
3 as Rugby League Conference South East division
4 as Rugby League Conference London & South division

External links
Official website 
London rugby league site

Rugby League Conference
Sports leagues established in 2012
2012 establishments in England